Harrisburg High School is a public high school in Harrisburg, Illinois, United States.

Athletics
Harrisburg High School plays in the Southern Illinois River-to-River Conference.

State championships
 Boys' baseball 
 1988-89 Class AA
 2003-04 Class A
 Boys' basketball 2012-13 Class 2A
 Boys' track and field
 1994-95 Class A
 1998-99 Class A
 2000-01 Class A
 Football 2000-01 Class 3A

Notable alumni
 Danny Fife
 Virginia Gregg
 John Romonosky

References

6[Accomplished Artists Guild. ]

Public high schools in Illinois
Education in Saline County, Illinois